Jesús Castro

 Jesús Castro-Balbi, French-American cellist
 Jesús Castro (Mexican footballer), Mexican unused reserve on Mexico's 1930 World Cup team
 , Uruguayan footballer in 1957 Americas cup
 Jesús Castro, Puerto Rican bassist with Puerto Rican Power Orchestra
 Jesús Castro (actor) (1993), Spanish actor, star of El Niño
  (1906), Mexican politician
 Jesús Castro (Spanish footballer) (1951–1993), Spanish footballer
 Humberto Jesús Castro García (1957), Cuban painter
  (1983), Spanish basketball player